Perkunas Virgae is a streak of colour on Titan, the natural satellite of Saturn.

Characteristics 
Perkunas Virgae is centred at 27° latitude south and 162 longitude west, and measures 980 km at its widest point.

Observation 
Perkunas Virgae was discovered on images transmitted by the Cassini Mission.

It is named after Perkūnas, head rain god in Lithuanian mythology.

References 

Surface features of Titan (moon)